The Houston Astros' 1993 season was a season in American baseball. It involved the Houston Astros attempting to win the National League West. This was also the final season that the Astros wore their "Tequila Sunrise" rainbow uniforms. They would switch to a more contemporary look the next year.

Offseason
 October 5, 1992: Denny Walling was released by the Astros.
 November 17, 1992: Butch Henry was drafted by the Colorado Rockies from the Houston Astros as the 36th pick in the 1992 expansion draft.
 December 1, 1992: Doug Drabek was signed as a free agent by the Astros.
 December 4, 1992: Greg Swindell was signed as a free agent by the Astros.
 January 5, 1993: Jack Daugherty was signed as a free agent by the Astros.
 February 1, 1993: Jim Lindeman signed as a free agent by the Astros.

Regular season

Season standings

Record vs. opponents

Notable transactions
 June 3, 1993: Billy Wagner was drafted by the Astros in the 1st round (12th pick) of the 1993 Major League Baseball draft. Player signed June 22, 1993.
 July 12, 1993: Jack Daugherty was traded by the Astros to the Cincinnati Reds for Steve Carter.

Roster

Game log

|-
|- style="background:#fbb;"
| 1 || April 5 || Phillies || 1–3 || || || || 0–1
|- style="background:#fbb;"
| 2 || April 6 || Phillies || 3–5 || || || || 0–2
|- style="background:#fbb;"
| 3 || April 7 || Phillies || 3–6  || || || || 0–3
|- style="background:#cfc;"
| 4 || April 9 || @ Mets || 7–3  || || || || 1–3
|- style="background:#cfc;"
| 5 || April 10 || @ Mets || 6–3 || || || || 2–3
|- style="background:#cfc;"
| 6 || April 11 || @ Mets || 5–4 || || || || 3–3
|- style="background:#cfc;"
| 7 || April 13 || @ Expos || 9–4 || || || || 4–3
|- style="background:#cfc;"
| 8 || April 14 || @ Expos || 9–5 || || || || 5–3
|- style="background:#fbb;"
| 9 || April 15 || @ Expos || 1–2 || || || || 5–4
|- style="background:#cfc;"
| 10 || April 16 || Marlins || 9–3 || || || || 6–4
|- style="background:#fbb;"
| 11 || April 17 || Marlins || 4–9 || || || || 6–5
|- style="background:#cfc;"
| 12 || April 18 || Marlins || 3–0 || || || || 7–5

|-
|- style="background:#fbb;"
| 46 || May 28 || @ Marlins || 4–5  || || || || 24–22
|- style="background:#cfc;"
| 47 || May 29 || @ Marlins || 4–2 || || || || 25–22
|- style="background:#cfc;"
| 48 || May 30 || @ Marlins || 2–1 || || || || 26–22
|- style="background:#cfc;"
| 49 || May 31 || Expos || 2–1 || || || || 27–22

|-
|- style="background:#fbb;"
| 50 || June 1 || Expos || 1–2 || || || || 27–23
|- style="background:#cfc;"
| 51 || June 2 || Expos || 5–4 || || || || 28–23
|- style="background:#cfc;"
| 52 || June 4 || Mets || 7–2 || || || || 29–23
|- style="background:#cfc;"
| 53 || June 5 || Mets || 7–5 || || || || 30–23
|- style="background:#cfc;"
| 54 || June 6 || Mets || 5–4 || || || || 31–23
|- style="background:#fbb;"
| 55 || June 7 || @ Phillies || 5–7 || || || || 31–24
|- style="background:#cfc;"
| 56 || June 8 || @ Phillies || 6–3 || || || || 32–24
|- style="background:#fbb;"
| 57 || June 9 || @ Phillies || 0–8 || || || || 32–25

|-

|-
|- style="background:#cfc;"
| 119 || August 17 || Marlins || 4–0 || || || || 62–57
|- style="background:#cfc;"
| 120 || August 18 || Marlins || 2–1 || || || || 63–57
|- style="background:#cfc;"
| 121 || August 19 || Marlins || 8–3 || || || || 64–57
|- style="background:#fbb;"
| 122 || August 20 || Phillies || 4–6 || || || || 64–58
|- style="background:#cfc;"
| 123 || August 21 || Phillies || 3–2  || || || || 65–58
|- style="background:#cfc;"
| 124 || August 22 || Phillies || 7–3 || || || || 66–58
|- style="background:#cfc;"
| 125 || August 24 || @ Marlins || 4–0 || || || || 67–58
|- style="background:#cfc;"
| 126 || August 25 || @ Marlins || 3–2 || || || || 68–58
|- style="background:#fbb;"
| 127 || August 26 || @ Marlins || 4–5  || || || || 68–59
|- style="background:#fbb;"
| 128 || August 27 || @ Expos || 1–3 || || || || 68–60
|- style="background:#fbb;"
| 129 || August 28 || @ Expos || 3–7 || || || || 68–61
|- style="background:#fbb;"
| 130 || August 29 || @ Expos || 2–3 || || || || 68–62
|- style="background:#fbb;"
| 131 || August 30 || @ Mets || 4–5 || || || || 68–63
|- style="background:#cfc;"
| 132 || August 31 || @ Mets || 10–2 || || || || 69–63

|-
|- style="background:#cfc;"
| 133 || September 1 || @ Mets || 3–2 || || || || 70–63
|- style="background:#fbb;"
| 134 || September 3 || Expos || 0–3 || || || || 70–64
|- style="background:#fbb;"
| 135 || September 4 || Expos || 5–7 || || || || 70–65
|- style="background:#cfc;"
| 136 || September 5 || Expos || 7–1 || || || || 71–65
|- style="background:#cfc;"
| 137 || September 6 || Mets || 7–2 || || || || 72–65
|- style="background:#cfc;"
| 138 || September 7 || Mets || 4–3  || || || || 73–65
|- style="background:#cfc;"
| 139 || September 8 || Mets || 7–1 || || || || 74–65
|- style="background:#fbb;"
| 140 || September 10 || @ Phillies || 2–6 || || || || 74–66
|- style="background:#cfc;"
| 141 || September 11 || @ Phillies || 4–1 || || || || 75–66
|- style="background:#cfc;"
| 142 || September 12 || @ Phillies || 9–2 || || || || 76–66

|-

|- style="text-align:center;"
| Legend:       = Win       = Loss       = PostponementBold = Astros team member

Player stats

Batting

Starters by position
Note: Pos = Position; G = Games played; AB = At bats; H = Hits; Avg. = Batting average; HR = Home runs; RBI = Runs batted in

Other batters
Note: G = Games played; AB = At bats; H = Hits; Avg. = Batting average; HR = Home runs; RBI = Runs batted in

Pitching

Starting pitchers 
Note: G = Games pitched; IP = Innings pitched; W = Wins; L = Losses; ERA = Earned run average; SO = Strikeouts

Other pitchers 
Note: G = Games pitched; IP = Innings pitched; W = Wins; L = Losses; ERA = Earned run average; SO = Strikeouts

Relief pitchers 
Note: G = Games pitched; W = Wins; L = Losses; SV = Saves; ERA = Earned run average; SO = Strikeouts

Farm system

LEAGUE CHAMPIONS: Tucson, Jackson

References

External links
1993 Houston Astros season at Baseball Reference

Houston Astros seasons
Houston Astros season
Houston